Rocco Robert Shein (born 14 July 2003) is an Estonian professional footballer who plays as a midfielder for Eredivisie club Utrecht and the Estonia national football team.

Club career

Flora
A product of Flora youth academy, Shein made his professional debut on 22 November 2020 in a Meistriliiga match against Nõmme Kalju, coming on as a substitute in the 75th minute for Markus Poom in a 3–0 away victory. On 10 August 2021, he made his UEFA Europa League debut as a substitute in extra-time against Omonia, which ended in a loss on aggregate after a penalty shootout.

Utrecht
On 31 January 2022, Shein moved to Eerste Divisie club Jong Utrecht on loan, with an option to sign a permanent contract until 2025 at the end of the spell. He made his competitive debut for the club on 4 February, coming on as a late substitute in a 2–0 loss to Volendam. In the following match, on 7 February, Shein managed to score his first goal in a 3–2 victory against Helmond Sport.

Shein made his Utrecht first-team debut in the Eredivisie on 29 April, starting in midfield in a 1–0 home victory against NEC.

On 27 May 2022, Utrecht exercised their option to buy Shein's rights, he signed a three-year contract with the club and was transferred to the senior squad.

International career
Shein made his debut for the Estonia national football team on 13 June 2022 in a friendly against Albania.

Honours 
Flora
 Meistriliiga: 2020
 Estonian Supercup: 2021

References

External links 
 

2003 births
Living people
Footballers from Tallinn
Estonian footballers
Estonia youth international footballers
Estonia under-21 international footballers
Estonia international footballers
Association football midfielders
FC Flora players
Jong FC Utrecht players
FC Utrecht players
Esiliiga players
Meistriliiga players
Eerste Divisie players
Eredivisie players
Estonian expatriate footballers
Expatriate footballers in the Netherlands
Estonian expatriate sportspeople in the Netherlands